Harrison Miller may refer to:

Harrison Miller (actor) in Takers
Harrison Miller Farmhouse, see National Register of Historic Places listings in Goodhue County, Minnesota

See also
Harry Miller (disambiguation)